Copernicia humicola is a palm which is endemic to Cuba.

References

humicola
Trees of Cuba